Kieran Ngwenya (born 25 September 2002) is a professional footballer who plays for Scottish Championship club Raith Rovers on loan from Aberdeen, as a defender. Born in Scotland, he represents the Malawi national team.

Playing career
Ngwenya made his professional debut in a league win over Ross County in December 2020.

In March 2021, Ngwenya moved on loan to Cove Rangers in Scottish League One. He was then loaned to Kelty Hearts in September 2021.

In July 2022, Ngwenya joined Scottish Championship club Raith Rovers on a six-month-long loan deal.

International career
Born in Scotland, Ngwenya is also eligible for Malawi and Trinidad and Tobago through his parents. In June 2021, he made his debut for Malawi in a 2–0 friendly defeat to Tanzania, starting the match.

References

External links
AFC Heritage Profile

2002 births
Living people
Footballers from Glasgow
People with acquired Malawian citizenship
Malawian footballers
Malawi international footballers
Scottish footballers
Malawian people of Trinidad and Tobago descent
Sportspeople of Trinidad and Tobago descent
Scottish people of Malawian descent
Scottish people of Trinidad and Tobago descent
British sportspeople of Trinidad and Tobago descent
Scottish Professional Football League players
Association football defenders
Aberdeen F.C. players
Cove Rangers F.C. players
Black British sportsmen
Kelty Hearts F.C. players
Raith Rovers F.C. players